Wang Yao-lin (born February 5, 1991) is a Taiwanese professional baseball pitcher for the Fubon Guardians of the Chinese Professional Baseball League (CPBL).  He is the older brother of Wei-Chung Wang. He is a member of the Amis people.

Career
On June 15, 2010, Wang signed with the Chicago Cubs as an international free agent and was assigned to the Single-A Boise Hawks. Wang made it as high as the advanced Single-A Daytona Cubs in 2014 before being released on January 17, 2015. Later that season, he signed with the Lamigo Monkeys of the Chinese Professional Baseball League and has played for the club through the 2020 season.

International career
He represented Chinese Taipei national baseball team at the 2009 Asian Junior Baseball Championship, 2013 World Baseball Classic Qualification, 2013 World Baseball Classic, 2013 exhibition games against Japan 2014 Asian Games and 2017 Asia Professional Baseball Championship.

References

External links 

1991 births
Living people
Arizona League Cubs players
Asian Games medalists in baseball
Asian Games silver medalists for Chinese Taipei
Baseball pitchers
Baseball players at the 2014 Asian Games
Boise Hawks players
Lamigo Monkeys players
Rakuten Monkeys players
Daytona Cubs players
Medalists at the 2014 Asian Games
People from Taitung County
Amis people
Peoria Chiefs players
Taiwanese expatriate baseball players in the United States
2013 World Baseball Classic players